The Camowen River is a river in County Tyrone, Northern Ireland, a tributary of the River Foyle.

Course
The Camowen River rises south of Pomeroy and flows westward, being bridged by the B46 in Tiroony and meeting a tributary south of Carrickmore. It meets another tributary near Bracky, then flows southwestwards under the B158. It turns northwards into Omagh, passing behind Tyrone County Hospital and meeting the River Drumragh at the centre of the town. From this point on it is called the River Strule.

Wildlife

The Camowen River is a salmon fishery.

See also
Rivers of Ireland

References

Rivers of County Tyrone